, also known in English simply as Nishijin, is a 1961 Japanese short documentary film directed by Toshio Matsumoto. It starred Hideo Kanze as a Noh player. Film scholar Mitsuyo Wada-Marciano has written that the film's "depiction of a craftsmen's forced life in the traditional textile trade of Kyoto discloses the multiplicity of the Japanese as well as offering an instance to contemplate the role of cinema as the most popular culture at that time."

Cast 
 Hideo Kanze as a Noh player

References

External links 
 

Japanese short documentary films
1960s Japanese films